Anarchytecture is the sixth studio album by English band Skunk Anansie. It was produced by Tom Dalgety and released in January 2016 through earMUSIC and Carosello Records.

Critical reception

Anarchytecture received mixed professional reviews.

The Clash magazine wrote that while it sounded "more sincere" than the previous album Black Traffic the songwriting was still "timid", citing the lead single "Love Someone Else" as "one of the dullest songs" ever written by Skunk Anansie. The reviewer did, however, remark specific tracks like "Death To The Lovers" that was reminiscent of early songs like "Hedonism", and "Without You" as typical Skunk Anansie songs. Drowned in Sound wrote that the album skipped from genre to genre "in a fairly risk-free, but comfortably accomplished way". With Anarchytecture, Skunk Anansie knew how "to produce the best possible version of themselves". The reviewer for Gigwise criticised that after 20 years, Skunk Anansie's original sounds had been turned to "more conventional, melody-driven rock". Nonetheless he praised singer Skin's honest lyrics and found that the album was enjoyable for old and new fans alike. The Record Collector magazine wrote that Anarchytecture continued the band's 1990s sound. Also the reviewer for the Sonic Seducer found references to Skunk Anansie's musical past in songs like "We Are The Flames" and "Suckers!". He wrote also that "In The Backroom" was reminiscent of Gossip while the opulent "Death To The Lovers" could as well have been performed by Annie Lennox.

Papers like the Hackney Gazette and the London Evening Standard were more critical. The former stated that the album was partly solid but also "forgettable" in other parts and that the band was struggling to match their early dynamic style. A review by the latter newspaper found that the album's "horrible portmanteau title [was] reflected in the record’s jarring combination of big guitars and lurking synths."

Track listing 
All songs written by Skunk Anansie, except "Love Someone Else" by Skin and Martin Buttrich.

Personnel
Skunk Anansie
Skin - vocals, backing vocals
Martin "Ace" Kent - guitar
Richard "Cass" Lewis - bass guitar, keyboards
Mark Richardson - drums, percussion
with
Pete Davis - keyboards, programming

Charts

References

External links
 Anarchytecture at Pledge Music

2016 albums
Skunk Anansie albums
Albums produced by Tom Dalgety
Carosello Records albums